Big Circumstance is the sixteenth full-length album by Canadian singer/songwriter Bruce Cockburn. The album was released in 1988 by True North Records. Rounder Records issued a remastered CD of the album in 2005 with a new acoustic version of "If a Tree Falls" as a bonus track.

Reception

In his retrospective review for Allmusic, critic Rob Caldwell wrote the album "was a move away from the somewhat dated, overblown sound of his previous World of Wonders, toward a leaner, more guitar-dominated sound... he takes pains to differentiate himself from right-wing Christianity and express his different view of the faith."

Track listing
All songs written by Bruce Cockburn.
"If a Tree Falls" – 5:43
"Shipwrecked at the Stable Door" – 3:38
"Gospel of Bondage" – 5:45
"Don't Feel Your Touch" – 4:49
"Tibetan Side of Town" – 6:59
"Understanding Nothing" – 4:26
"Where the Death Squad Lives" – 4:28
"Radium Rain" – 9:22
"Pangs of Love" – 5:18
"The Gift" – 6:04
"Anything Can Happen" – 4:31

Personnel
Bruce Cockburn – composer, vocals, guitar, harmonica
Fergus Jamison Marsh – bass, Chapman Stick
Hugh Marsh – violin
Jon Goldsmith – keyboards, autoharp
Michael Sloski – drums, percussion
Myron Schultz – clarinet
Judy Cade – background vocals 
Mary Margaret O'Hara – background vocals
Mose Scarlett – background vocals

Production
Jon Goldsmith – producer
George Whiteside – photography
Bart Schoales – art direction

References

1988 albums
Bruce Cockburn albums
True North Records albums